The Thirteen Club (13 Club) is a secret society at the College of William & Mary, founded in 1890, and noted for its philanthropic practices. Little information has been made public regarding their campus activities. In fact, the society maintains such a high level of secrecy that even members' wives and children are unaware of their membership. Such was the case of Louise Kale, Director of William and Mary's Historic Campus, who only became aware of her father's membership after his death. In recent years, they have allowed for outside communication through their campaign "Be Here Now."

Although there are a number of other secret societies with the phrase "Thirteen Club" in their name, there is no known evidence connecting the groups. One such society is the Thirteen Club created in 1880 to debunk the superstition of "13 at a table" being unlucky. By 1887, the Thirteen Club was 400-strong, over time gaining five U.S. Presidents as honorary members: Chester Arthur, Grover Cleveland, Benjamin Harrison, William McKinley and Theodore Roosevelt.

In New York at the December 13, 1886 meeting of the Thirteen Club, Robert Green Ingersoll ended his toast, "The Superstitions of Public Men":

References

Sources
 Radford, M. & Radford, E. (1949) Encyclopedia of Superstitions 
 Lachenmeyer, N. 13: The Story of the World's Most Popular Superstition

External links
 The 1880s Supper Club That Loved Bad Luck

Clubs and societies in the United States
Superstitions
Triskaidekaphobia